The Staffordshire flag  is the flag of the English county of Staffordshire. It was registered with the Flag Institute on 28 March 2016 following a competition between two rival designs. The winning design was proposed by the Staffordshire Heritage Group as a simplified version of the other candidate, the Staffordshire County Council Banner of Arms.



Design
The flag incorporates the Stafford knot in gold on the de Stafford coat of arms. The symbol of the Stafford knot is unique to the county, with a venerable tradition and widespread usage. It is incorporated into the logo of the Staffordshire County Cricket Club and of Staffordshire Fire and Rescue Service amongst others. The colour scheme of gold on red is similarly included on many of the arms found in the county, such as the coat of arms of Keele University as well as on the arms used by Staffordshire County Council.

Staffordshire County Council Banner

In the absence of an adopted flag, the banner of the arms of Staffordshire County Council have been used as a symbol of Staffordshire. The arms are similar to the simple chevron and knot, but with smaller proportions of the knot and the addition of the lion Chief indicating the authority of the council. This banner had been made available commercially in the absence of an adopted flag. The design is the property of the council; however, in 2015 Staffordshire County Council declared that they would happily allow the banner to be taken forward as a county flag. The county council also declared that they were in discussion with the Flag Institute regarding formal adoption of the banner design.

In the absence of an adopted flag, the banner had been flown alongside the Union Flag above the Department for Communities and Local Government. It was also adopted by the crew of the RFA Wave Ruler in 2010, as its captain is from Stafford.

References

Staffordshire
Staffordshire
Staffordshire